Geocharis  is a genus of plants in the family Zingiberaceae. It is native to insular Southeast Asia (Malaysia, Indonesia, Philippines).

 Geocharis aurantiaca Ridl. - Johor
 Geocharis fusiformis (Ridl.) R.M.Sm. - Philippines, Sabah
 Geocharis macrostemon (K.Schum.) Holttum - Sumatra
 Geocharis radicalis (Valeton) B.L.Burtt & R.M.Sm. - Sumatra
 Geocharis rubra Ridl. - Sarawak
 Geocharis secundiflora (Ridl.) Holttum - Peninsular Malaysia

References

Alpinioideae
Zingiberaceae genera